Giju may refer to: Albino Gorilla
Gijow
Gijuiyeh (disambiguation)